Thomas Gascoigne may refer to:

 Thomas Gascoigne (academic) (1404–1458), vice-chancellor of Oxford University
 Sir Thomas Gascoigne, 2nd Baronet (1596–1686)
 Sir Thomas Gascoigne, 8th Baronet (1745–1810)
 Thomas Gascoigne (businessman) (1786–1809), British mine owner
 Thomas Gascoyne (1876–1917), English cyclist
 Thomas Gascoigne (footballer) (1899–1991), English footballer